Robin Norwood (born July 27, 1945) is the author of the international  best-selling book, Women Who Love Too Much as well as Letters from Women Who Love Too Much, Daily Meditations for Women Who Love Too Much (illustrated by Richard Torregrossa ) and Why Me? Why This? Why Now?.
Robin Norwood is a licensed marriage and family therapist who worked in the field of addiction for fifteen years.  She specialised in treating co-alcoholism and relationship addiction.   She lives on a ranch in the central coast area of California.

Books
Robin Norwood's books have been translated into over thirty languages and continue to sell worldwide. Women Who Love Too Much was a number one seller on the New York Times Best Seller list with over three million copies in print worldwide.

References 

1945 births
Living people
American self-help writers